St. Lawrence's Church, Gotham is a Grade I listed parish church in the Church of England in Gotham, Nottinghamshire.

It is part of an informal grouping of five churches that are known collectively as "The 453 Churches" as they straddle the A453. The other churches in the group are: 
St. George's Church, Barton in Fabis
St. Winifred's Church, Kingston on Soar
Holy Trinity Church, Ratcliffe-on-Soar
All Saints’ Church, Thrumpton

History

The church dates from the 13th century and was restored in 1789 and repaired in 1869.

St. Lawrence, Gotham is the largest of the five churches and was re-ordered in 2010 to create a flexible modern worship space that is used for many different events throughout the year.

Incumbents

???? Robert de Nottingham
???? Saher de St Andrew
???? Richard de Role
???? Peter de Leyke
1303 John de Gotham
1342 John de Gotham
1351 John Cayn
1353 William Hunt
1395 John Swyft
???? William Maltby
1431 Richard Peas
1440 John Ketall
1463 William Redeman
1480 William Buckley
1487 John Haygate
1507 Hugh de St Andrew
1528 Thomas Babbington
1543 John Sacheverell
1546 Richard Walker
1567 John Lowthe
1590 Richard Dodds
1607 John Savage
1609 Oliver Withington
1619 John Foxcroft
1663 Moses Foxcroft
1673 William Danvers
1674 John Bridges
1710 William Bridges
1746 Samuel Martin
1776 John Lightfoot
1788 John Kirkby
1836 John James Vaughan
1882 Frederick A Wodehouse
1915 Reginald Alfred Bidwell
1925 Claude Wilfred Good
1930 Bernard Parker Hall
1954 Norman Copeland, O.B.E.
1971 Alfred Donald Williams
1989 David Gorick
2000 Stephen Osman
2011 Richard Coleman

Memorials
There are many memorials within the church including:
Anne Borrow, 1799
Thomas Borrow, 1773
John Barrow, 1707
Isaac Barrow, 1745
Samuel Martin, 1775
Gergii Loxcroete, 1619
John Bridges, 1710
John Foxcroft, 1662
John St. Andrew and his wife, 1625

References

External links
 Southwell & Nottingham church history project

Church of England church buildings in Nottinghamshire
Grade I listed churches in Nottinghamshire
13th-century church buildings in England